Gérard Garitte (1914–1990) was a Belgian historian and an academic at the Catholic University of Leuven and later the French-speaking University of Louvain in Louvain-la-Neuve, Belgium. He raised the study of Georgian ecclesiastical literature to a high level. In 1959, he was awarded the Francqui Prize on Human Sciences ("Orientalisme chrétien - Philologie classique"). In 1962, strongly opposed to the expulsion of French speakers from the Catholic University of Louvain, he created the ACAPSUL movement together with Georges Lemaître to fight against the split of the university.

See also
 Kartvelian studies

References

External links
 Georgian Literature in European Scholarship

1914 births
1990 deaths
20th-century Belgian historians
Kartvelian studies scholars
Academic staff of the Catholic University of Leuven (1834–1968)
Academic staff of the Université catholique de Louvain